CityFibre is a British telecommunications company, based in London, England. It owns, operates and maintains fibre-to-the-building infrastructure in at least 60 cities in the United Kingdom. 

As of 21 March 2022, 1.5 million premises have been made available to premises across the UK to potentially connect to the CityFibre network.

City Fibre are currently in the process of removing 400 employees from their books due to the down turn in Fibre uptake 

CityFibre acts as a wholesaler, leasing connections to other consumer ISPs, including TalkTalk, Vodafone, Trunk Networks, Zen Internet, Andrews and Arnold, and others.

References

External links  
 

Internet service providers of the United Kingdom
Telecommunications companies of the United Kingdom
Companies based in London
Telecommunications companies established in 2011
2011 establishments in England